Whirlpool State Park is a  state park located in Niagara County, New York, north of the city of Niagara Falls.  The park overlooks the Niagara Whirlpool on the Niagara River and the lower Niagara Gorge.

Description
Whirlpool State Park is a day-use park offering a playground, picnic tables and pavilions, hiking and biking, a nature trail, fishing, and cross-country skiing. A visitor's center is open during the summer months from 9 a.m. to 4:30 p.m., Wednesday through Sunday.

A stone staircase within the park descends into the Niagara Gorge; a  section of the staircase was reconstructed in 2016. The park is connected with nearby Devil's Hole State Park via the Devil's Hole Trail at the gorge's bottom, as well as a trail along the gorge's rim, which together form a complete loop.

See also
 List of New York state parks

References

External links
 New York State Parks: Whirlpool State Park

State parks of New York (state)
Parks in Niagara County, New York